George McConnaughey (c. 1897 – March 16, 1966) served as chairman of the Federal Communications Commission from October 4, 1954, to June 30, 1957 as a Republican. He died after a long illness with cancer.

See also
FCC Network Study Committee (1955)

References
George McConnaughey's obituary at The Washington Post 

Specific

Chairmen of the Federal Communications Commission
1890s births
1966 deaths
Eisenhower administration personnel